FK Arsenal is a Montenegrin professional football club based in the coastal town of Tivat, founded in 1914. Currently, the club is competing in the Montenegrin First League.

History

Period 1914-1940
Founded in 1914, Arsenal is the second oldest football club in Montenegro, after FK Lovćen which was founded a year before. The club was first established as NK Orjen. During 1930, the team was merged with another club from Tivat - NK Zrinjski. After the fusion, the team started to play under the new name NK Arsenal. The name was derived from the nearby naval repair facility "MRTZ Sava Kovačević", known colloquially as Arsenal.
NK Arsenal made biggest successes in history in the period between 1925-1940. Team from Tivat at that time played in the Montenegrin Football Championship, with remarkable success at season 1937 - with winning the title of Montenegrin champion. Arsenal became the only club outside Podgorica and Cetinje who won the title on Montenegrin championship in the period between 1925-1940.

Period 1945-2006
After World War II, NK Arsenal played in the first season of the Montenegrin Republic League (1946), together with Budućnost, Lovćen and Sutjeska. NK Arsenal gained promotion to the Yugoslav Second League (Zone B) with debut in the 1955-56 season. They played three years in the Second League, and got relegated to the Republic League after the 1957-58 season.
Most seasons in the period between 1958-2006 Arsenal spent in the Montenegrin Republic League, with second place in the 1958-59 season as a major success.
During the 1980s and 1990s, Arsenal produced many talented players. Its youth team which included the generation of players born in 1971/72 is regarded within the club as the most talented one. It was coached by Radovan Vukotić and Zlatko Vuksanović and produced players such as Ivica Kralj (played with Partizan, Porto and PSV),  Željko Buzić (Hajduk Kula), Slaven Borović (Čukarički) or Zoran Vuksanović (Radnički Niš and Hajduk Kula).

Period 2006-
After Montenegrin independence, FK Arsenal became a member of the Montenegrin Second League in its inaugural season (2006-07). With often relegations to the Montenegrin Third League, Arsenal spent ten seasons in the Second League until now.

During this period, Arsenal won the Southern Region Cup three times (2009, 2010, 2011).

In the 2021–22 season, Arsenal were placed in second place of the Montenegrin Second League, after which he defeated FK Podgorica in the playoffs and were promoted to the Montenegrin First League for the first time in its history.

Honours and achievements
Montenegrin Championship (1922-1940) – 1
winners (1): 1937
runners-up (3): 1929, Spring 1930, Autumn 1930
 Montenegrin Third League (South Region) – 3
winners (3): 2011-12, 2016–17, 2017–18
 Montenegrin Fourth League – 3
winners (3): 1979-80, 1983–84, 1987–88
Southern Region Cup – 3
winners (3): 2009, 2010, 2011

Players

Current squad

Notable players
Below is the list of the most notable players which, during their career, played for FK Arsenal.

 Ivica Kralj
 Branislav Janković
 Zoran Vuksanović

Stadium

The club plays at Stadion u parku (Park Stadium) in Tivat, near the Porto Montenegro Marina, which was formerly the naval repair facility MTRZ Sava Kovačević, popularly known as Arsenal, after which the club was named. Stadium capacity is 2,000 seats on one stand, and it doesn't meet UEFA standards for European competitions.

See also
Montenegrin Football Championship (1922-1940)
Montenegrin First League
Montenegrin clubs in Yugoslav football competitions (1946–2006)

References

External links

Association football clubs established in 1914
Football clubs in Montenegro
1914 establishments in Montenegro
Tivat